Robert Grove (c. 1511 – 1579/80), of Donhead St. Andrew, Wiltshire, was an English Member of Parliament and a gentleman or yeoman.

He married Joan Combe of Cann, Dorset, and they had one daughter and three sons including the MP, William Grove.

He was a Member (MP) of the Parliament of England for Shaftesbury in 1545 and 1572.

References

1511 births
1580 deaths
English MPs 1545–1547
People from Wiltshire
English MPs 1572–1583